Samuel Haiyupis is a Nuu-chah-nulth artist from Ahousaht, British Columbia. The Canadian Museum of History has one of his carvings on display in its Grand Hall.

Early life 
Samuel Haiyupis is from Ahousaht, his grandmother was named Pawatsquii and his grandfather was named Haiyupis. He is Nuu-chah-nulth clan.

When Samuel Haiyupis was aged six, the family moved to Port Alberni so he could start school. At school he experienced racism.

Career 
Haiyupis' art has been shown in the Royal British Columbia Museum, and his 2010 carved rattle Kupkuumyis is on display in the Grand Hall of the Canadian Museum of History.

Family life 
Samuel Haiyupis married Beverly Jack on 5th May 1984 at the United Church in Ahousaht. They have a daughter named Geneva Faith Haiyupis.

References 

Living people

First Nations woodcarvers
Artists from British Columbia
Year of birth missing (living people)
Nuu-chah-nulth people